The Royal Navy's Victoria class (or Sans Pareil class) of the 1880s was the first class of ironclad warship (sometimes described as a battleship) which used triple expansion steam engines, previous classes having used compound engines.

There were only two ships in this class. The lead ship, was sunk in an accidental collision with another Royal Navy battleship, HMS Camperdown in the Mediterranean Sea with the loss of half of her crew. Her sister ship, survived until she was scrapped in April 1907.

Design

Armament

The original intention had been to fit 13.5 inch (343 mm), 67-ton guns in place of the Conquerors 12 inch (305 mm) guns in the single forward turret but late during the design it was decided to enlarge them to take the 16.25 inch (413 mm), 110-ton gun. At a period when naval supremacy of the Mediterranean was seen as a crucial part of British policy, the Victoria class was intended for service as part of the British Mediterranean Fleet. The same model of gun had been fitted in the last  , which had a single example in each of its two barbettes instead of pairs of 13.5 inch (343 mm) guns and was the only other British warship to carry them.

The gun was not successful in service since it took four or five minutes to load and fire. The barrel only had a 75-round life and the muzzle tended to droop.

The rear turret contained a smaller 10 inch (254 mm) gun of similar design, and which weighed 26 tons.

Seakeeping

This class was one of the last of this period to have very low freeboard, of around 10 feet (3 m). This was done to reduce target area in a naval engagement but had a deleterious effect upon seaworthiness, and was an important factor in Victoria sinking within fifteen minutes following a collision since it allowed the water to quickly reach the gun turret ports.

Propulsion
The most successful innovation of the class was the introduction of triple expansion steam engines into Royal Navy battleships. These engines had been developed as a result of the introduction of steel in boiler manufacture, which in turn had led to higher steam pressures. The Royal Navy had originally tried them with great success in the torpedo gunboat . The principal benefit was the improved efficiency of the engine meant a reduced displacement because less coal was needed. In trials, which had been re-engined with triple-expansion engines in 1889–1891, showed that the coal consumption at 80% power was roughly halved.

Ships

References

Bibliography 

 

 David Brown, Warrior to Dreadnought: Warship development 1860–1905, Chatham Publishing.

External links

Battleship classes
 
Ship classes of the Royal Navy